Bni Tadjite is a rural commune and town in Figuig Province, Oriental, Morocco. According to the 2004 census, the town had a population of 8,029.

References

Populated places in Figuig Province
Rural communes of Oriental (Morocco)